Önsöz (Foreword) is the seventh studio album by Turkish singer Gülşen. It was released on 22 December 2009 by Arista Records and Sony Music Entertainment.

Content and release
The album consisted of 11 songs in total, ten of which were written and composed by Gülşen herself, who took inspiration from the events in her own life when preparing the lyrics. It was recorded at Sarı Ev studios and produced and arranged by Ozan Çolakoğlu. Aside from its new songs, the album contains a cover of "Dillere Düşeceğiz Seninle", which was originally performed by Nazan Öncel for her 1994 album Ben Böyle Aşk Görmedim. The songs "Bi' An Gel" and "Ezberbozan" ranked first and third on Türkçe Top 20 respectively. "Önsöz" and "Dillere Düşeceğiz Seninle" were also among the top 10 on the official chart, occupying the sixth and tenth place respectively.

Music videos
Nihat Odabaşı directed three of the album's four music videos: "Bi' An Gel", "Ezberbozan", and "Dillere Düşeceğiz Seninle". The music video for "Ezberbozan" was shot at Film Sokağı in Istanbul. Her new image and appearance in the video was compared by some to that of American actress Marilyn Monroe. For the hippie-themed music video of the song "Önsöz", Gülşen worked with the stylist Ceyda Balaban. The music video was directed by Murat Onbul.

Reception
Mehmet Tez of Milliyet praised the graphic design and style of the album's cover, and found it suitable for Gülşen's style. He also believed that her collaboration with Ozan Çolakoğlu was a key factor for the album's success, yet added that she should avoid putting songs from completely different genres in one album.

Track listing 
All of the songs were written and composed by Gülşen, unless stated otherwise.

Personnel 

 Gülşen – singer-songwriter
 Ozan Çolakoğlu – producer, composer , arranger, keyboard, programming, backing vocals 
 Nazan Öncel – songwriter 
 Erdem Sökmen – guitar 
 Mehmet Akatay – percussion 
 Ömer Aslan – percussion 
 Cengiz Ercümer – percussion 
 Fatih Ahıskalı – oud, cümbüş, gittern 
 Ahmet Türkmenoğlu – bass 
 Motor Ali Yılmaz – bağlama
 Gündem – Bowed string instruments 
 Özgür Yurtoğlu – electric guitar 
 Serdar Barçın – flute 
 Eyüp Hamiş – ney , kaval 
 Cihan Okan – backing vocals 
 Eda Pala – backing vocals 
 Ercüment Vural – backing vocals 
 Yeşim Vatan – backing vocals 
 Emir – backing vocals 
 Kaan – backing vocals 
 Emirhan Cengiz – recording
 Seda Seber – recording
 Bahadır Sağdaş – string instruments group recording
 Özgür Yurtoğlu – mixing
 Chris V. Rautenkranz – mastering
 Nihat Odabaşı – photographs, graphic design
 Ceyda Balaban – image, concept
 Seyit Karakaş – hair
 Yıldırım Özdemir – hair
 Erkan Uluç – make-up
 Republica – graphic design
 Onur Ofset – printing

Credits adapted from Önsözs album booklet.

Release history

References

External links 
 Önsöz – Discogs

2009 albums
Gülşen (singer) albums
Sony Music albums
Turkish-language albums